President Panchaksharam is a 1959 Indian Tamil-language comedy film directed by A. Bhimsingh and written by B. S. Ramiah. It is based on the play of the same name written by Ramiah, itself adapted from the 1836 play The Government Inspector by Russian Nikolai Gogol. The film stars S. S. Rajendran, S. V. Sahasranamam and B. Saroja Devi. It was released on 10 July 1959 and became a commercial success.

Plot 

A District Board president has a daughter studying in Madras. While he and his wife have different men as prospective grooms for her in their minds, the girl falls in love with her friend Sigamani. The two aspiring grooms come to the president's town to finalise the marriage. Suddenly, the president receives a letter stating that the government is sending an official to secretly investigate his fraudulent affairs. When Sigamani visits the president and says he loves his daughter, the president mistakenly identifies Sigamani as the official.

Cast 

Male cast
 S. S. Rajendran as Sikhamani
 S. V. Sahasranamam as President Panchaksharam
 T. R. Ramachandran
 V. R. Rajagopal
 D. Balasubramaniam
 D. V. Narayanasami
 Pakkirisami
 Kottapuli Jayaraman

Female cast
 B. Saroja Devi as Panchaksharam's daughter
 S. N. Lakshmi
 T. V. Kumudhini
 N. Chandhini
Dance
 Sayee Subbulakshmi

Production 
Playwright B. S. Ramiah adapted Russian dramatist Nikolai Gogol's 1836 play The Government Inspector into a Tamil play titled President Panchaksharam with S. V. Sahasranamam starring. The play, which was produced by Sahasranamam's own company Seva Stage, and had Devika in a key role, was critically acclaimed, and it was adapted into a film with the same title. Sahasranamam, who appeared in the play, returned for the film as well. The film adaptation was directed and edited by A. Bhimsingh, and produced by V. Arunachalam and Chinna Annamalai under Savithri Pictures. Ramiah wrote the screenplay and dialogues. Cinematography was handled by M. Karnan, and the art direction by Chowdhury. The film featured a musical play based on V. O. Chidambaram Pillai.

Soundtrack 
The soundtrack of the film was composed by G. Ramanathan, while the lyrics were written by Subramania Bharati, Kannadasan, K. S. Gopalakrishnan and Ku. Ma. Balasubramaniam.

Release and reception 
President Panchaksharam was released on 10 July 1959. Kanthan of Kalki positively reviewed the film for being different from formulaic Tamil films released before. The film was commercially successful, and film historian Randor Guy said it would be remembered for "the interesting screenplay and good performances by Sahasranamam, Rajendran and Saroja Devi." Following Rajendran's death in 2014, Prakash Upadhyaya of International Business Times described it as one of his "best works as actor".

References

Bibliography

External links 
 

1950s Tamil-language films
1959 comedy films
1959 films
Films based on adaptations
Films based on The Government Inspector
Films directed by A. Bhimsingh
Films scored by G. Ramanathan
Films set in Chennai
Indian black-and-white films
Indian comedy films
Indian films based on plays